Over 60 Minutes with Red Rider is a compilation album for the Canadian rock band Red Rider, which was released in 1987.

Track listing

References

Red Rider albums
1987 compilation albums
Capitol Records compilation albums